Sebastien Francois Turenne Des Pres (born 11 November 1998) is an American soccer player who last played for Michigan Stars FC in the National Independent Soccer Association.

Club career

Des Pres joined the academy at Real Salt Lake in 2015, scoring two goals in 33 games in the 2015–16 season.

In January 2017, he joined Football League Two side Blackpool on an 18-month contract. He made his debut for the Seasiders in an EFL Trophy game against Wycombe Wanderers on 10 January 2017.

Des Pres joined Fleetwood Town on a 12-month contract in September 2017.

Des Pres joined USL Championship side Orange County SC in December 2018, ahead of their 2019 season.

In July 2020, Des Pres signed with Michigan Stars FC of the National Independent Soccer Association ahead of the fall season.. He did not return for the spring 2021 season.

International career

Des Pres has been capped twice by the United States at under-19 level. In April 2017, he was called up to a training camp by the under-20 team ahead of the 2017 FIFA U-20 World Cup. Des Pres is also eligible to play for France.

References

External links

1998 births
Living people
American expatriate soccer players
American expatriate sportspeople in England
American soccer players
Association football midfielders
Blackpool F.C. players
Expatriate footballers in England
Fleetwood Town F.C. players
Orange County SC players
Michigan Stars FC players
People from Encinitas, California
Real Salt Lake players
Soccer players from California
Sportspeople from San Diego County, California
United States men's youth international soccer players
National Independent Soccer Association players